Petka is a village in the municipality of Kostolac, city of Požarevac, Serbia. According to the 2002 census, the village has a population of 1285 people.

See also
Populated places of Serbia

References

Populated places in Braničevo District